The Goz Abu Goma Bridge is a railway bridge across the White Nile at Kosti, the former Goz Abu Goma. It is 50 miles south of Alays in Sudan.

The structure is on the railway line between Khartoum and Al-Ubayyid.

There are nine main river openings with a total span of 536 metres long.

The bridge was completed by Cleveland Bridge & Engineering Company in 1911.

References

Railway bridges in Sudan
Bridges completed in 1911
1911 establishments in Sudan